Guttmann is a surname.  It may refer to the following people:

 Artur Guttmann (1891–1945), Austrian film score composer
 Béla Guttmann (1900–1981), Hungarian football (soccer) player and coach
 Jakob Guttmann (rabbi) (1845–1919), German rabbi and religious Zionism philosopher
 Jakob Guttmann (sculptor) (1811–1860), Hungarian sculptor
 Julius Guttmann (1880–1950), German rabbi, historian of Judaism-philosophy, son of Jakob
 Ludwig Guttmann (1899–1980), German-born neurologist and founding father of organized physical activities for the disabled
 Marcus Guttmann (born 1991), Austrian volleyball player
 Paul Guttmann (1834–1893), German pathologist
 Ronald D. Guttmann (born 1936), American physician

See also 
 Guttman
 Gutmann (disambiguation)
 Gutman
 Gutmans (disambiguation) 
 Goodman (disambiguation)

Surnames